Evian is a brand of bottled spring water.

Evian or variation,  may also refer to:

 Évian-les-Bains (aka Évian) a commune in France 
 Évian Accords (1962) a treaty that ended the Algerian War of Independence
 Évian Conference (1938) a conference to deal with Jewish refugees fleeing Germany
 The Evian Group at IMD (formerly Evian Group) a group of governments and businesses committed to global markets that are open, inclusive, equitable, sustainable
 Evian Resort Golf Club, Évian-les-Bains, France
 The Evian Championship (golf) a women's golf championship in France
 Thonon Évian Savoie F. C. (aka Évian) a soccer team located in Thonon-les-Bains, France